Lago Olivo (Italian for "olive tree lake" ) is a lake in the Province of Enna, Sicily, Italy.

Lakes of Sicily